Tama-i-hara-nui  (17?? –  1830/1831), also known as Te Maiharanui and Tamaiharanui, was a New Zealand Māori chief of Ngāi Tahu. He was described as "strong and ruthless" and was a central figure in the 1820s "kai huanga" feud, meaning "eat relatives". Tama-i-hara-nui angered Ngāti Toa by letting a group of their chiefs into Kaiapoi pā and then killing them. Te Rauparaha, one of the Ngāti Toa chiefs who stayed outside of the pā, returned to Banks Peninsula in November 1830 and captured Tama-i-hara-nui. He was taken to Ōtaki, where he was tortured by the wives of the chiefs who had been killed at Kaiapoi pā, and then killed himself.

References

Year of birth unknown
1830s deaths
Ngāi Tahu people